Doe Doe Green (1889 - 1944) was a comic actor. A review of a 1922 performance of his with the Jack "Ginger" Wiggins company described him as a "popular neat dancing comedian". He portrayed Booker T in the 1931 film Enemies of the Law. In the 1937 production Big Blow he was the only African American in the cast playing a role described as "a Negro lost in a white man's world" as he seeks to protect an orphaned white girl.

D. D. Green's 2-act play Back to Africa was published in 1923.

Theater
Jake's Family (1915)
Swanee River Home (1922)
Liza (1922) (1922) by Maceo Pinkard
Appearances (Broadway show) (1925) as Rufus
The Green Pastures (1930) as Gabriel
Big Blow (1937)
The Patriots (play) (1943)

References

1889 births
1944 deaths